Biltoy-Yurt (Kerla-Bilta) is a rural locality (a selo) in Gudermessky District, Chechnya.

Administrative and municipal status 
Municipally, Biltoy-Yurt is incorporated as Biltoy-Yurtovskoye rural settlement. It is the administrative center of the municipality and is the only settlement included in it.

Geography 

Biltoy-Yurt is located just north of the Caucasus Highway R-217.

The nearest settlements to Biltoy-Yurt are Kadi-Yurt in the north, Engel-Yurt in the north-east, Gerzel-Aul and Koshkeldy in the south-east, and Gordali-Yurt, Nizhny Noyber and Verkhny Noyber in the south-west.

History 
Biltoy-Yurt was founded for people from the Nozhay-Yurtovsky District who were forced to relocate to the plains area after the devastating landslides in 1989. Residents of Biltoy-Yurt are mostly from the former village with the same name in Nozhay-Yurtovsky District, as well as from Bilty, Mekhkeshty, and Rogun-Kazha.

Population 
 1990 Census: 206
 2002 Census: 1,149
 2010 Census: 1,872
 2019 estimate: 2,078

According to the results of the 2010 Census, the majority of residents of Biltoy-Yurt (1,870 or 99,89%) were ethnic Chechens, with 2 people (0,11%) who did not specify their ethnic background.

Education 
Biltoy-Yurt hosts one secondary school.

References 

Rural localities in Gudermessky District